Arthur Ernest Elliott Mann (26 July 1889 – 2 January 1949) was an Australian rules footballer who played for the Essendon Football Club in the Victorian Football League (VFL).

Notes

External links 
		

1889 births
1949 deaths
Australian rules footballers from Victoria (Australia)
Essendon Football Club players